A.K.A. Goldfish is the title of a 1994 American creator-owned comic book series written and drawn by Brian Michael Bendis. The series was originally published by Caliber Comics, with later issues  by Image Comics. The entire award-winning series was collected and published as a trade paperback, entitled Goldfish rather than A.K.A. Goldfish, in 2001.

The black-and-white series is a noir fiction tale, telling the story of David Gold, a con man, who used the sobriquet "Goldfish". Gold has returned to Cleveland, Ohio after a ten-year absence in order to regain possession of his son, currently in the custody of the boy's mother and Gold's ex-girlfriend, crime boss Lauren Bacall (a reference to the well-known actress of the same name). Bacall is the owner of the Club Cinderella, a nightclub, casino and brothel, and scene for many sequences within the story.

References

1994 comics debuts
Comics by Brian Michael Bendis
Caliber Comics titles
Image Comics titles